James Stannus (2 October 1788 – 28 January 1876) was an Irish Anglican priest in the first half of the  19th-century.

Stannus was the son of Thomas Stannus  Member of Parliament (MP) for Portarlington from 1798 to 1800. He was born in Portarlington and educated at Trinity College, Dublin After a curacy in Ballinderry he was Rector  of Lisburn then Dean of Ross, Ireland from 1829  until his death.

Arms

References

Alumni of Trinity College Dublin
Deans of Ross, Ireland
1876 deaths
1788 births
People from Portarlington, County Laois